The Thai League Cup is a knock-out football tournament played in Thai sport. Some games are played as a single match, others are played as two-legged contests. The 2012 Thai League Cup kicked off on 3 April 2012 with the Bangkok & field regional qualifiers.

Calendar

Qualifying first round

|colspan="3" style="background-color:#FF99FF"|Northern Region
|-
|colspan="3" style="background-color:#99CCCC"|3 April 2012

|-
|colspan="3" style="background-color:#99CCCC"|4 April 2012

|-
|colspan="3" style="background-color:#FF99FF"|North Eastern Region
|-
|colspan="3" style="background-color:#99CCCC"|3 April 2012

|-
|colspan="3" style="background-color:#99CCCC"|4 April 2012

|-
|colspan="3" style="background-color:#FF99FF"|Bangkok & field Region
|-
|colspan="3" style="background-color:#99CCCC"|3 April 2012

|-
|colspan="3" style="background-color:#99CCCC"|4 April 2012
|-

|-
|colspan="3" style="background-color:#FF99FF"|Central & Eastern Region
|-
|colspan="3" style="background-color:#99CCCC"|4 April 2012
|-

|-
|colspan="3" style="background-color:#99CCCC"|6 April 2012
|-

|-
|colspan="3" style="background-color:#FF99FF"|Southern Region
|-
|colspan="3" style="background-color:#99CCCC"|3 April 2012

|}

Qualifying Second round

|colspan="3" style="background-color:#FF99FF"|Northern Region
|-
|colspan="3" style="background-color:#99CCCC"|11 April 2012

|-
|colspan="3" style="background-color:#FF99FF"|North Eastern Region
|-
|colspan="3" style="background-color:#99CCCC"|11 April 2012

|-
|colspan="3" style="background-color:#FF99FF"|Bangkok & field Region
|-
|colspan="3" style="background-color:#99CCCC"|11 April 2012

|-
|colspan="3" style="background-color:#FF99FF"|Central & Eastern Region
|-
|colspan="3" style="background-color:#99CCCC"|11 April 2012

|}

First round

|colspan="3" style="background-color:#99CCCC"|9 June 2012

|-
|colspan="3" style="background-color:#99CCCC"|10 June 2012

|-
|}

Second round

|colspan="3" style="background-color:#99CCCC"|11 July 2012

|}

Third round

|colspan="3" style="background-color:#99CCCC"|22 August 2012

|}

Quarter-finals

|colspan="5" style="background-color:#99CCCC"| 1st leg on 5 September 2012.............2nd leg on 11,19 September 2012

|}

Semi-finals

|colspan="5" style="background-color:#99CCCC"| 1st leg on 26 September 2012.............2nd leg on 17 October 2012

|}

Finals

|colspan="3" style="background-color:#99CCCC"|10 November 2012

|}

2012 in Thai football cups
Thailand League Cup
2012
2012